The 1942 Albuquerque Air Base Flying Kellys football team, sometimes known as the Flying Colin Kellys, represented Albuquerque Air Base during the 1942 college football season. The Flying Kellys compiled a 5–4 record, not including an October 30 intra-squad game in which the starters defeated the substitutes. Captain Ted Shipkey (head coach at New Mexico before the war) was the head coach, and Ted Wright was the assistant coach. Wright served as acting head coach against Arizona State due to an injury to Shipkey. 

The team utilized the "accordion shuffle shift" offense that Shipkey had developed during his tenure as head coach with the New Mexico Lobos.

The team was named after Colin Kelly, an Army aviator who was killed when his B-17 Flying Fortress was shot down in combat on December 10, 1941. The Air Base also adopted a New Mexico mountain burro as its mascot.

Schedule

Roster
The players included the following:

 Tiny Ahlgren, guard
 Roy Anderson, back, formerly of Fullerton High
 Ed Beddow, center, formerly of Arizona
 Red Bennett, end, formerly of Ole Miss
 W.L. "Bobby" Boblett, quarterback, formerly of West Virginia Normal
 Paul Bognar, guard
 Dick Campbell
 Church, back, formerly of California
 Jack Dungan, tackle, formerly of Arizona
 French Faucheau, guard
 Mike Gahar, tackle
 Troy "Cotton" Gann
 Gardell, guard
 Tony Gasparovich, tackle, formerly of Washington
 Newton Goss, fullback
 Reece Hill, halfback, formerly of New Mexico
 Bernie "Lefty" Honan, end, formerly of Wake Forest
 Harvey Johnson, halfback, formerly of Ole Miss or Mississippi State
 James H. Kent, tackle, formerly of Alabama
 T.E. "Tommy" Keough, halfback, formerly of Wisconsin State
 Ray Kinslow, fullback, sometimes spelled as "Kenslow" 
 Ed Kintz, tackle, formerly of Puget Sound College
 Lt. Clee Maddox, back, formerly of Indiana
 Wick Malphurs
 Eddie Marshall, end, formerly of Georgia
 Charlie Mathis, guard
 Hank Morris, center
 J.O. "Bob" Nestra, halfback, formerly of Texas A&M
 "Two Ton" Polk, center
 Ralph R. "Robby" Robinette, tackle, formerly of Sul Ross
 Ted Shipkey, head coach, appeared in one play against Colorado Springs, at age 38, and injured a tendon in the back of his leg and was sent to El Paso for medical treatment
 J.R. Shoupe, end, formerly of SMU
 Vic Smith, guard,
 Dick Shoupe, end, formerly of SMU
 Lt. J.S. "Connie" Sparks, formerly of TCU
 Cecil Szepanski
 Ted Wright, assistant coach played in the Colorado Springs game on November 15 on his 32nd birthday

References

 
Albuquerque Air Base
Albuquerque Air Base Flying Kellys football seasons
Albuquerque Air Base Flying Kellys football